Khin Maung Win (born 25 May 1955) is a Burmese politician who currently serves as a House of Nationalities member of parliament for Tanintharyi No. 11 . He is a member of National League for Democracy.

Early life and education 
Win was born on 23 May 1955 in Danubyu , Myanmar. He graduated M.B.B.S from University of Medicine, Yangon. His previous job is Medical Doctor.

Political career 
Win was elected as a Tanintharyi Region MP, winning a majority of 28,264 votes, from Tanintharyi Region No. 11 parliamentary constituency. He also serves as a member of Amyotha Hluttaw Ethnic Affairs Committee.

References

National League for Democracy politicians
1955 births
Living people
People from Tanintharyi Region